Suʻād Māhir Muḥammad (29 August 1917 – 1996) was an Egyptian archaeologist, best known for her work on the Islamic history of Egypt. She was  awarded the Order of the Arab Republic of Egypt, second class, in 1977.

References 

1917 births
1996 deaths
20th-century Egyptian historians